The  G. E. Lemmon House, at 507 3rd Ave., W, in Lemmon, South Dakota, was built in 1908.  It was listed on the National Register of Historic Places in 1976.

It is significant for association with G.E. Lemmon, remembered as "the embodiment of what a real cowboy was, rather
than the mythical image many believe."  Among other achievements, Lemmon handled the most cattle in one day, over 900, in "cutting out, roping and carrying to fire for branding", according to the National Livestock Association.

References

Houses on the National Register of Historic Places in South Dakota
Houses completed in 1908
Perkins County, South Dakota